Anna Lucyna Wielebnowska (born 17 April 1978 in Kraków) is a Polish former basketball player who competed in the 2000 Summer Olympics.

References

1978 births
Living people
Polish women's basketball players
Olympic basketball players of Poland
Basketball players at the 2000 Summer Olympics
Sportspeople from Kraków